Settle Down is the fourth studio album by American singer-songwriter Julia Nunes.

Background
Nunes launched a Kickstarter page for her fourth album on June 11, 2011, . She exceeded her goal of $15,000 in less than a day, receiving over $19,000. The project gathered $77,888 total in donations. The album was released on February 28, 2012.

Composition
"He is Mad", "Pizza", and "I Wasn't Worried" are mini-songs roughly a minute in length, all of which Nunes recorded videos for and posted to YouTube. Other songs, like "Odd", "Balloons", "First Impressions", "Comatose", and "Into the Sunshine" appeared on previous albums, but were re-recorded for Settle Down.

Promotion
Nunes updated the Kickstarter project page with a video of her performing "Stay Awake" in the Kickstarter offices (thanks to the overwhelming success of her campaign). On January 24, 2012, she performed "Stay Awake" on Conan to promote the album.

Track listing

Charts

References

2012 albums
Folk rock albums by American artists